Agustín Andrés Adorní (born June 18, 1990) is an Argentinian football forward playing for América General Pirán.

Career
Born in Rosario, Santa Fe, Adorní is the product of Provincial, Newell's Old Boys and Central Córdoba's youth systems, and he made his professional debut in the Primera B Metropolitana with Central Córdoba at age 17. After the club was relegated, he had spells in the lower leagues with Juventud de Pergamino and Sarmiento de Resistencia.

References

External links 
 Agustin Adorni at playmakerstats.com (English version of ceroacero.es)

Living people
1990 births
Argentine expatriate footballers
Argentine footballers
Association football forwards
Expatriate footballers in El Salvador
Central Córdoba de Rosario footballers
Juventud de Pergamino footballers
Sarmiento de Resistencia footballers
Footballers from Rosario, Santa Fe